The Group Men event was held on July 25, 2009, as a part of Aerobic Gymnastics.

Results

References

Group Men
2009 in gymnastics